Gemini Suite Live is a recording of Jon Lord's classical/rock piece Gemini Suite featuring the Mark II band lineup of Deep Purple, recorded live during this one and only live performance in 1970. A follow up to their "Concerto" Project, it featured five movements for the individual members of the band, including a guitar piece from Blackmore.

Track listing
All movements composed by Jon Lord.

Personnel
 Conducted by Malcolm Arnold
Ian Gillan – vocals
Ritchie Blackmore – guitar
Jon Lord – organ, keyboards
Roger Glover – bass
Ian Paice – drums
 The Orchestra of the Light Music Society

References

1998 live albums
Deep Purple live albums
Purple Records live albums